Profundiconus ikedai is a species of sea snail, a marine gastropod mollusk in the family Conidae, the cone snails and their allies.

Like all species within the genus Profundiconus, these cone snails are predatory and venomous. They are capable of "stinging" humans, therefore live ones should be handled carefully or not at all.

Description
The size of the shell varies between 25 mm and 50 mm.

Distribution
This marine species occurs off Vietnam and in Sagami Bay, Japan

References

 http://ci.nii.ac.jp/naid/  Ninomya Taizo, Conus (Profundiconus) ikedai n. sp.; Venus: the Japanese journal of malacology, 1987
 Tucker J.K. & Tenorio M.J. (2009) Systematic classification of Recent and fossil conoidean gastropods. Hackenheim: Conchbooks. 296 pp.

External links
 The Conus Biodiversity website
 

ikedai
Gastropods described in 1987